The  is one of eight active brigades of the Japan Ground Self-Defense Force. The brigade is subordinated to the Western Army and is headquartered in Naha, Okinawa. Its responsibility is the defense of Okinawa Prefecture.

History
The 15th Brigade was raised to replace the 1st Combined Brigade on March 26, 2010.

Organization 
 15th Brigade, in Naha
 15th Brigade HQ, in Naha
 51st Infantry Regiment note 1, in Naha
 15th Anti-Aircraft Artillery Regiment, in Yaese, with three Type 3 Chū-SAM, and one Type 11 Surface-to-air missile battery
 Miyako Area Security Force, in Miyakojima
 15th Reconnaissance Company, in Naha, with Type 87 armored reconnaissance vehicles
 15th Combat Engineer Company, in Naha
 15th Signal Company, in Naha
 15th Aviation Squadron, in Naha, flying UH-60JA and CH-47J/JA helicopters
 15th NBC-defense Company, in Naha
 101st Explosive Ordnance Disposal Company, in Naha
 15th Logistic Support Battalion, in Naha

note 1: Infantry Regiments have only battalion strength.

References

External links
 Homepage 15th Brigade (Japanese)

Japan Ground Self-Defense Force Brigade
Military units and formations established in 2010